What a Way to Go! is a 1964 American black comedy film directed by J. Lee Thompson and starring Shirley MacLaine, Paul Newman, Robert Mitchum, Dean Martin, Gene Kelly, Bob Cummings and Dick Van Dyke.

Plot
In a dream-like pre-credit sequence, Louisa, a black-clad widow, descends a pink staircase inside a pink mansion. She is followed by pallbearers carrying a pink coffin. The pallbearers slip and drop the coffin, which slides down the stairs, leading into the opening titles.

Louisa wants to give her $211 million to the U.S. government Internal Revenue Service, who believes it is an April Fools' Day joke. Sobbing to her unstable psychiatrist, Dr. Stephanson, Louisa tries to explain why she wants to give away her money, leading to a series of flashbacks, interspersed with fantasy sequences.

Louisa describes her childhood as being a young, idealistic girl. Her money-grubbing mother pushed Louisa to marry rich local business owner, Leonard Crawley. Louisa instead marries Edgar Hopper, a poor shop owner who, inspired by Henry David Thoreau, prefers a simple life. They are happily poor until the jilted Leonard arrives and ridicules their rustic lifestyle, humiliating Edgar and motivating him to achieve success. Edgar transform his small store into a tremendous empire, neglecting Louisa, ruining Crawley, and eventually overworking himself to an early death. 

A grieving Louisa travels to Paris where she meets Larry Flint, an impoverished avant-garde artist. They fall in love, marry, and live a picturesque bohemian lifestyle. Larry invents a crane-like machine that converts eclectic sounds into paint strokes on canvas. One day, Louisa plays classical music that produces a beautiful painting resulting in Larry's first major art sale. Larry builds larger cranes and sells many more paintings, making him a successful artist. One night, two petulant cranes turn on their creator and beat him to death.

Louisa, richer and more depressed, prepares to return to the US. When she misses her flight, famed business tycoon Rod Anderson Jr. offers her a lift on his private jet. She initially finds him cold and calculating, but sees his softer side during the flight. They marry shortly after and live luxuriously. Fearful of losing him like her first two husbands, Louisa convinces Rod to retire to a small farm similar to his boyhood home. After sharing a jug with a few locals, an inebriated Rod mistakenly attempts to milk a bull, which kicks him through the barn wall, leaving Louisa widowed once again.

Now fantastically wealthy, Louisa wanders the country. In a small-town café, she meets Pinky Benson who, for over a decade, has performed nightly dressed as a clown. Management loves Pinky's corny musical act because it never distracts the customers from eating and drinking. The two fall in love and idyllically live aboard Pinky's run-down houseboat on the Hudson River. On Pinky's birthday, Louisa suggests he perform without his usual time-consuming make-up and costume so they will not be late for his party after the show. Without his clown getup, the customers notice that Pinky sings and dances beautifully. Virtually overnight, Pinky is a famous Hollywood star. He neglects Louisa and becomes so arrogant and self-centered that he has the entire mansion painted pink so fans will know it is his. At his film premier, despite being warned, Pinky insists on greeting his excited fans. They become frenzied and trample Pinky to death.

After hearing Louisa's story, Dr. Stephanson proposes marriage, claiming to be the simple man she wants. She declines, which she declares is progress in her recovery. Stephanson accidentally presses the switch that raises the movable psychiatric couch about ten feet. Sitting on the edge, he falls off and is knocked unconscious, leaving Louisa stranded on top. The janitor enters and helps Louisa down. She is shocked it is Leonard Crawley, who lost everything after Edgar Hopper ruined his business. Leonard claims he is happy and credits Louisa and Thoreau for making his life "successful" because it is simple.

Leonard and Louisa marry and enjoy a bucolic life on a farm with their four children. The story ends when Leonard, plowing a field, is distracted while reading Thoreau and apparently strikes oil after the tractor tire grinds into the ground. Louisa is distraught, believing her curse has struck again until oil company representatives arrive and say that Leonard punctured their pipeline. Leonard and Louisa rejoice, as they are still poor but happy.

Cast

 Shirley MacLaine as Louisa May Foster
 Paul Newman as Larry Flint
 Robert Mitchum as Rod Anderson Jr.
 Dean Martin as Leonard Crawley
 Gene Kelly as Pinky Benson
 Bob Cummings as Dr. Victor Stephanson
 Dick Van Dyke as Edgar Hopper
 Reginald Gardiner as mad painter brushing everything in Pinky's palace pink, including rabbits and Louisa
 Margaret Dumont as Mrs. Foster, Louisa's overbearing mother
 Lou Nova as Trentino, owner of the café where Louisa discovered Pinky Benson
 Fifi D'Orsay as Baroness who praises Larry Flint's paintings
 Maurice Marsac as René, Larry Flint's fellow Parisian painter and friend
 Wally Vernon as Hollywood agent visiting at Pinky's swimming pool
 Jane Wald as Polly, Larry Flint's fellow Parisian artist and friend who shoots paint from a shotgun
 Lenny Kent as Hollywood lawyer who explains Pinky Benson's will to Louisa

Uncredited (in order of appearance)

Dean Martin–Dick Van Dyke sequence/silent film spoof  
 Dick Wilson as Driscoll, Crawley's store manager
 Marjorie Bennett as Mrs. Freeman, customer at Hopper's store
 Christopher Connelly as Ned, Hopper's store clerk
 Burt Mustin as lawyer reading Edgar Hopper's will to Louisa and her mother

Paul Newman sequence/foreign art film spoof  
 Marcel Hillaire as French lawyer reading Larry Flint's will to Louisa and René

Robert Mitchum sequence/Lush Budgett spoof  
 Barbara Bouchet as bikini-clad girl on Rod Anderson's plane whom he asks, "What are you doing after the orgy?"
 Anthony Eustrel as Willard, Rod Anderson's valet on the flight to New York
 Peter Duchin as Peter, the pianist at the lavish cocktail party
 Tom Conway as Lord Kensington, who meets Louisa and Rod Anderson at a lavish cocktail party
 Queenie Leonard as Lady Kensington who, alongside her husband, meets Louisa and Rod
 Milton Frome as lawyer reading Rod Anderson's will to Louisa

Gene Kelly sequence/musical spoof  
 Fred Aldrich as Herbert, patron who enters the café where Louisa just met Pinky Benson
 Arlene Harris as grey-haired café patron during Pinky's act, from whose table Pinky grabs salt 
 Teri Garr as dancer in the Louisa/Pinky shipboard musical number
 Joel Grey as café patron enjoying Pinky's act
 Phil Arnold as Hollywood press and publicity agent visiting at Pinky's swimming pool
 Army Archerd as TV announcer at premiere of Pinky's 5-hour film Flaming Lips

Dean Martin sequence/end scene  
 Pamelyn Ferdin as Geraldine, 4-year-old daughter of Louisa and Leonard Crawley

Production

Development
Publicist Arthur Jacobs wanted to move into film production. One of his clients was Marilyn Monroe who said she would appear in a movie Jacobs produced if she liked the story. He found I Love Louisa based on a story by Gwen Davis about a woman with six husbands. In June 1962, Daryl Zanuck reportedly told Marilyn Monroe that she would make two films for 20th Century Fox (which he was in the process of taking over again): a re-vived Something's Got to Give and What a Way to Go (the alternate title for I Love Louisa). Monroe's fee would be a million dollars for both films. In July, Monroe reportedly approved J. Lee Thompson as director after watching Tiger Bay and Northwest Frontier and she was going to meet Gene Kelly to discuss his being her co-star. Monroe died in August 1962.

In September 1962, Jacobs said that J. Lee Thompson, who was another client of his, would direct the film following The Mound Builders (which became Kings of the Sun). Jacobs wanted one of the "top three" stars in the world to play the lead, and "important names" to play the six husbands. No distributor had been signed. Later that month Thompson said he would make I Love Louisa with Elizabeth Taylor. In October the Los Angeles Times reported that the Mirisch Company, who had a long-term deal with Thompson, would finance. That month Betty Comden and Adolph Green signed to write the script. In December Thompson said Comden and Green wanted to call the movie What a Way to Go and that he hoped Frank Sinatra and Marcello Matroianni to play husbands.

In January 1963, Thompson said he was confident about Frank Sinatra, Marlon Brando and David Niven playing husbands. In April 1963 Hedda Hopper reported that Steve McQueen would star in the film opposite Shirley MacLaine.

MacLaine was formally signed in July 1963. Also that month Jacobs announced he had signed a deal with 20th Century Fox for the latter to finance and distribute. The production companies would be Jacob's Apjac and Thompson's Malibu Productions. The stars would be MacLaine, Dean Martin, Paul Newman, Robert Mitchum, Dick Van Dyke and Gene Kelly. Filming would start 8 August. Jacobs called the project "a sad comedy – a farout picture that has both loudness and pathos."

According to Mitchum, Frank Sinatra had wanted $500,000 for two weeks worth of work, so they offered the role to Mitchum instead. He agreed to do it because he liked working with MacLaine and Thompson (who had directed him in Cape Fear).

MacLaine said, "There is – I hope – pathos, anyway that's what I'm trying to do. It's funny for a girl to go through five husbands, getting wealthier with the death of each one – but it's sad, too, because she didn't want them to die and she hates money."

Gene Kelly originally had the rights to the story, intending to direct it, but relinquished it to Jacobs.  Kelly agreed to appear in a single sequence. He choreographed the dance as well, calling it "a kind of gentle spoof of old movie musicals, though not as much of a parody, really, as Sing Along with Mitch."

Robert Mitchum's role was originally meant for Frank Sinatra, but Sinatra suddenly wanted several times more money than what the other male leads received, and the studio refused his demands. Gregory Peck was sought, but he was unavailable. The previous year, MacLaine had co-starred with Mitchum in Two for the Seesaw, and she recommended him to director J. Lee Thompson who passed the endorsement on to the studio.

Cummings signed in September 1963.

The budget was a reported $5 million.

Shooting
Except for one scene at Los Angeles Airport, the entire film was shot on the Fox backlot on 73 sets. Because of the limited availability of the stars, the movie was shot over 45 days, which was considered short for a movie of this scale.

The swimming pool set in the Pinky Benson sequences is the same set (with some minor redressing) used for Something's Got to Give.

MacLaine was quoted as saying that she was happy to work with "Edith Head with a $500,000 budget, 72 hairstyles to match the gowns, and a $3.5-million gem collection loaned by Harry Winston of New York. Pretty good perks, I'd say."

Reception

Box office performance
What a Way to Go! premiered on May 12, 1964, and grossed $11,180,531 at the U.S. box office, earning $6.10 million in the United States.

According to Fox records, the film needed to earn $8.5 million in film rentals to break even and made $9.09 million, meaning it made a profit.

Film critics
John Simon of The New Leader wrote 'The mildest thing that can be said about this film is that it is an abomination'.

Awards
What a Way to Go! was nominated for two Academy Awards for Best Art Direction (Jack Martin Smith, Ted Haworth, Walter M. Scott, Stuart A. Reiss) and Best Costume Design by Edith Head and Moss Mabry, a BAFTA Best Foreign Actress Award for Shirley MacLaine, a Laurel award for Best Comedy and Best Comedy performer for Paul Newman, and an American Cinema Editors Eddie award for best editor for Marjorie Fowler. It won a Locarno Film Festival award for Best Actor for Gene Kelly.

References

External links
 
 
 
 
 
 What a Way to Go! at TV Guide (heavily cut and revised version of 1987 write-up originally published in The Motion Picture Guide)
 Complete dialogue

1964 films
1960s black comedy films
1964 romantic comedy films
1960s satirical films
20th Century Fox films
CinemaScope films
American black comedy films
American romantic comedy films
American satirical films
1960s English-language films
Films about widowhood
Films directed by J. Lee Thompson
Films scored by Nelson Riddle
Films set in New York City
Films set in Paris
Films set in Washington, D.C.
Films shot in Los Angeles
Films with screenplays by Betty Comden and Adolph Green
1960s French-language films
1964 drama films
1960s multilingual films
American multilingual films
1960s American films